Neurine is an alkaloid found in egg yolk, brain, bile and in cadavers.  It is formed during putrefaction of biological tissues by the dehydration of choline.  It is a poisonous, syrupy liquid with a fishy odor.

Neurine is a quaternary ammonium salt with three methyl groups and one vinyl group attached to the nitrogen atom.  Synthetically, neurine can be prepared by the reaction of acetylene with trimethylamine.  Neurine is unstable and decomposes readily to form trimethylamine.

References

Merck Index, 11th Edition, 6393.

Alkaloids
Quaternary ammonium compounds
Vinyl compounds